Leopold Tritsch was a Romanian footballer who played as a defender. His brother, Oscar Tritsch was also a footballer, they played together at Brașovia Brașov and Romania's national team.

International career
Leopold Tritsch played two friendly matches for Romania, making his debut together with his brother, Oscar on 26 October 1923 under coach Constantin Rădulescu in a 2–2 against Turkey. His second game was a 4–1 loss against Austria. He was also part of Romania's 1924 Summer Olympics squad.

References

External links
 

Year of birth missing
Year of death missing
Romanian footballers
Romania international footballers
Place of birth missing
Association football defenders
Liga I players